Golden Ivory is a 1954 British adventure film shot in Kenya.  It was directed by George P. Breakston and starred Robert Urquhart, John Bentley and Susan Stephen. The film was shot in Eastmancolor with prints by Technicolor. Released in colour in the United States as Outlaw Safari, it was later released as White Huntress in black and white.

Background
The film is set in the 1890s and is centered on British pioneer settlers in Kenya. In 1957, exploitation film specialists of American International Pictures acquired the rights as the studio's first foreign made feature film, retitled it White Huntress and released it in an edited black and white movie as a double feature with a shockumentary Naked Africa.

John Bentley later had the lead in the African Patrol television series that was produced by George Breakston and shot in Kenya.

Plot
Jim and Paul Dobson are a  pair of brothers who are White Hunters in 1890 British East Africa. Paul seeks to make his fortune by finding the location of an elephants' graveyard a friend told him about before he died.  The penniless pair decide to get near the location and get a wagon by hiring themselves out to protect and hunt game for a wagon train of settlers heading for Blood Mountain in the land of the Masai.  Paul fools their party by taking them on a more dangerous route in order to locate the ivory of the graveyard. En route they pick up Mr Seth a prospector who is vague about the whereabouts of his fellow prospectors. The party faces danger from both the local fauna and natives.

Cast

References

External links

1954 films
1954 crime films
Films set in Kenya
Films shot in Kenya
American International Pictures films
1954 adventure films
Films directed by George Breakston
Films set in 1890
1950s English-language films
British adventure films
British crime films
1950s British films